Mar Antony Prince Panengaden (born 13 May 1976) is an Indian Syro-Malabar Catholic hierarch, who serves as an Eparchial Bishop of Adilabad since 6 August 2015.

Life
Bishop Panengaden was born in Thrissur district of the Archeparchy of Thrissur and after graduation of the school education, joined the religious congregation of the Carmelites of Mary Immaculate, but in a short time left the religious life and was ordained as a priest on 25 April 2007 for the Eparchy of Adilabad, after the subsequent studies and graduation in the Dharmaram Vidya Kshetram (1998–2001), University of Calcutta (2001–2003) and the Ruhalaya Major Seminary in Ujjain, India (2003–2007).

After his ordination he went abroad to pursue his studies in the Pontifical Urbaniana University in Rome, Italy, with a Doctor of Biblical Studies degree. When he returned to India, Fr. Panengaden was engaged in the pastoral work as an assistant priest in the Holy Family Cathedral in Adilabad and as a priest in charge for the mission station in Saligao.

On 6 August 2015, he was appointed by the Pope Francis as the second eparchial bishop of the Syro-Malabar Catholic Eparchy of Adilabad. On 29 October 2015, he was consecrated as bishop by Major Archbishop Cardinal George Alencherry and other hierarchs of the Syro-Malabar Catholic Church.

References

See also

1976 births
Living people
People from Thrissur district
Indian bishops
Syro-Malabar bishops
University of Calcutta alumni
Pontifical Urban University alumni
Bishops appointed by Pope Francis